Saint-Dominique is a municipality in the Montérégie region of southwestern Quebec. The population as of the Canada 2011 Census was 2,327.

Demographics

Population

Language

See also
List of municipalities in Quebec

References

Municipalities in Quebec
Incorporated places in Les Maskoutains Regional County Municipality